Gavin D. J. Harper  (born 1986) is a technology author based in Machynlleth, Wales.

Biography 

He left school aged 16 to work for a large engineering company before studying for A levels. Aged 16 he contacted the Open University and enrolled on a degree course in technology and, at the same time, started writing his first book 50 Awesome Auto Projects for the Evil Genius. At the time, the Open University believed he was the youngest person to hold a full Open University degree, (However, he has since been overtaken by 16 year old Cameron Thompson.) He later studied for a master's degree in sustainable architecture with the University of East London.
He read for his PhD at Cardiff University.

He is a member of the National Energy Foundation's Advisory Council

Writing 

His works have been translated into Italian, Chinese and Korean.

Books 
Domestic Solar Energy: A Guide for the Homeowner - Crowood Press, 
Small Scale Wind Power Generation (Co-Author with Jamie Bull) - Crowood Press, 
Run Your Diesel Vehicle on Biofuels (Co-Author with Jon Starbuck)- Mc Graw Hill Professional, 
Holography Projects for the Evil Genius- Mc Graw Hill Professional, 
Fuel Cell Projects for the Evil Genius - Mc Graw Hill Professional, 
Solar Energy Projects for the Evil Genius (Foreword By Willie Nelson)- Mc Graw Hill Professional, 
Model Rocket Projects for the Evil Genius- Mc Graw Hill Professional, 
Build Your Own Car PC- Mc Graw Hill Professional,

Italian Translations
L'energia Solare E Le Sue Applicazioni Cinquanta Progetti Pratici. Hoepli.

Chinese Translations
科学鬼才:全息技术应用41例. 人民邮电出版社 
酷车电子产品制作DIY:50项目. 科学出版社 
科学鬼才:太阳能技术应用50例 
科学鬼才 汽车电子制作50例 图例版

Korean Translations
과학영재를 위한 50가지 태양에너지 프로젝트.

References

External links 
Chocolate Power (Science)
 (Huffington Post Profile)
 Wired, The spiralling environmental cost of our lithium battery addiction, By AMIT KATWALA, Sunday 5 August 2018
 New Statesman, Why Critical Materials are Exactly That, Gavin Harper
 Which?, How Environmentally Friendly Are Cordless Products
 The Independent, Gavin Harper, the 19 year old who's already written four books and taken an MSc
 The Telegraph, What happens to used Lithium Ion Batteries from Electric Cars
 How recyclable are batteries from electric cars?
 Where will the used EV batteries go?
 Batterien von Elektro-Autos werden zum Problem für die Umwelt
 Lithium-Ion Batteries Help Power Civilizations, But How Can They Be Recycled?

External links

1986 births
Living people
British non-fiction writers
People from Upminster
Writers from Cardiff
British male writers
Alumni of the Open University
Alumni of the University of East London
Alumni of Loughborough University
Alumni of Keele University
Alumni of Cardiff University
Male non-fiction writers